Sailing competitions at the 2023 Pan American Games in Santiago, Chile are schedule to take place between October 28 and November 5, 2023 at the Cofradia Nautica del Pacifico (Nautical Brotherhood of the Pacific in English) in the city of Algarrobo.

A total of 13 events will be contested, an increase of two from the 2019 Pan American Games. The sunfish event has been split in two, to have an event each for men and women. Also, the kites event was split in two, with the men and women now competing in separate events. The RS:X boat has also been replaced with the IQFoil.

A total of 172 sailors (82 men and 90 women) are scheduled to compete.

Qualification

A total of 172 sailors (82 men and 90 women) will qualify to compete at the games. A nation may enter a maximum of one boat in each of the 13 events and a maximum of 19 athletes (nine men and ten women). Each event had different qualifying events that began in 2021. The host nation (Chile) automatically qualified in all 13 events (19 athletes). More women will qualify to compete for the first time ever, after the lightning class switched to a two women and one man format for each boat. The winner of each sailing event at the 2021 Junior Pan American Games, directly qualified as well. Countries earning a spot at the 2021 Junior Pan American Games, can earn another boat in that respective event. The slot awarded at the games is to the athlete, and cannot be transferred to another athlete. A total of four universality quotas were available (two each in the laser and laser radial events).

Medal summary

Medal table

Medalists

Men's events

Women's events

Mixed events

See also
Sailing at the 2024 Summer Olympics

References

 
Events at the 2023 Pan American Games
Pan American Games
2023
Sailing in Chile